Diego Flores (born 18 December 1982) is an Argentine chess player who received the FIDE title of Grandmaster (GM) in 2008. He is a five-time Argentine Chess Champion.

Chess career
He competed in the FIDE World Cup in 2005, 2007, 2009, 2013 and 2017. Flores won the Argentine Chess Championships of 2005, 2009, 2012 2016, and 2017. Flores has played for the Argentine national team in the Chess Olympiad, the Pan-American Team Chess Championship and the Mercosur Chess Olympiad.  

In 2010 he won the 2nd Magistral Marcel Duchamp round-robin tournament in Buenos Aires, edging out  Sandro Mareco on tiebreak. In the same year Flores was granted the Konex Award Merit Diploma as one of the top five chess players of the decade in Argentina. In 2011, he tied for 1st–2nd place with Alexandr Fier in the 2nd Latin American Cup in Montevideo, finishing second on tiebreak. The following year Flores tied for first place in the American Continental Championship, held in Mar del Plata, with Julio Granda Zuñiga, Alexander Shabalov, Gregory Kaidanov and Eric Hansen.

He is also the chess columnist in Junín's daily Diario Democracia since 2004.

References

External links

 
 
 
 

1982 births
Living people
Argentine chess players
Chess grandmasters
Chess Olympiad competitors
People from Buenos Aires